Tiger by the Tail is a 1970 American drama film directed by R. G. Springsteen, written by Charles A. Wallace, and starring Christopher George, Tippi Hedren, Dean Jagger, John Dehner, Charo, Lloyd Bochner and Glenda Farrell. Shot in 1968, the film was released in January 1970, by Commonwealth United Entertainment.

Plot
Vietnam war hero (Christopher George), accused of murdering his brother, recruits his socialite girlfriend (Tippi Hedren) to hunt for the real killer.

Cast      
 Christopher George as Steve Michaelis
 Tippi Hedren as Rita Armstrong
 Dean Jagger as Top Polk
 John Dehner as Sheriff Chancey Jones
 Charo as Darlita
 Lloyd Bochner as Del Ware
 Glenda Farrell as Sarah Harvey
 Alan Hale Jr. as Billy Jack Whitehorn
 Skip Homeier as Deputy Sheriff Laswell
 R. G. Armstrong as Ben Holmes
 Dennis Patrick as Frank Michaelis
 Martin Ashe as Jimmy-San Ricketts
 Frank Babich as Reporter
 Marilyn Devin as Julie Foster
 Ray Martell as Garcia
 Burt Mustin as Tom Dugger
 Fernando Pereira as Mendoza
 Olga Velez as Candita

References

External links
 

1970 films
American drama films
1970 drama films
Films directed by R. G. Springsteen
United Pictures Corporation
1970s English-language films
1970s American films